Abū Saʿīd Sharaf ibn al-Muʾayyad ibn Abī l-Fatḥ al-Baghdādī (1170–1219), best known as Majd al-Din Baghdadi, was an important Sufi shaykh ("master") of the Kubrawiya school of Sufism. Baghdadi's students included Najm al-Din Razi (died 1256) and Razi al-Din Ali Lala (died 1244). His most significant work was Tuḥfat al-barara fī l-masāʾil al-ʿashara ("The gift of the pious in ten questions"), written in Arabic. Baghdadi also wrote several Persian works, including Risāla fī l-safar ("Treatise on [spiritual] travel"), as well as poems and letters.

He was the older brother of Baha al-Din Baghdadi.

References

1170 births
1219 deaths
Kubrawiya order
Sufis
Arabic-language writers
Persian-language writers